Poojashree Venkatesha (born 27 July 1990) is an Indian former tennis player, primarily competing on the ITF Women's Circuit. She won a silver medal for her native country in the women's singles event at the 2008 Commonwealth Youth Games.

Career

2008
Venkatesha was the runner-up and won the silver medal at the 2008 Commonwealth Youth Games. In the final, she was beaten by Heather Watson of Great Britain 6–2, 6–1.

2010
In the 2010 Commonwealth Games, Venkatesha lost and missed out on the bronze medal along with India's Nirupama Sanjeev for the women's doubles, defeated by Sania Mirza and Rushmi Chakravarthi of India, 6–4, 6–2.

ITF Circuit finals

Singles: 7 (5–2)

Doubles: 16 (9–7)

References
'Venkatesha gets beaten by Heather Watson in the 2008 Commonwealth Youth Games'- CWG Tennis Update
'Venkatesha wins the 2009 Circuit ITF tournament of US$10000 by beating United Kingdom's Emily Webley-Smith'- ITF Tennis: itftennis.com: 2009 Delhi ITF
'Venkatesha's basic information'- WTA Tour

External links
 
 

1990 births
Living people
Sportspeople from Mysore
Tennis players at the 2010 Commonwealth Games
Tennis players at the 2010 Asian Games
Indian female tennis players
Sportswomen from Karnataka
21st-century Indian women
21st-century Indian people
Racket sportspeople from Karnataka
Asian Games competitors for India
Commonwealth Games competitors for India